Eulithis explanata, the white eulithis, is a species of geometrid moth in the family Geometridae. It is found in North America.

The MONA or Hodges number for Eulithis explanata is 7206.

References

Further reading

 
 

Cidariini
Articles created by Qbugbot
Moths described in 1862